The Mixed duet free routine competition of the 2022 European Aquatics Championships was held on 13 August 2022.

Results
The event was held on 13 August at 16:05.

References

Artistic